Lactuca macrophylla or Cicerbita macrophylla, commonly known as common blue-sow-thistle, is a species of flowering plant in the family Asteraceae.

Gallery

References

macrophylla